ExodusPoint Capital Management ("ExodusPoint") is an American Hedge Fund headquartered in New York City with additional offices in Europe and Asia. It currently holds the largest launch in history for hedge funds where it raised $8.5 billion in 2018 after it started accepting capital from external investors.

Background 

In early 2017, ExodusPoint was founded by Michael Gelband and Hyung Lee. Both of them were previously employees at Millennium Management where Gelbrand was Head of Fixed Income while Lee was Head of Equities. Gelband was once seen as the heir to Israel Englander but after he was declined an ownership stake in the firm, he left to start ExodusPoint. Several employees from Millennium Management also left to join the new firm. Shortly after, Millennium Management filed an arbitration case against Gelband to stop him from poaching staff from it. Although the results were not received publicly, it is believed that Gelband won the lawsuit and was able to take staff from Millennium Management to establish his firm.

In 2018, ExodusPoint started accepting capital from external investors. In June,it had the largest launch in the history of hedge funds when it raised $8.5 billion in capital. Instead of charging the standard management fee, ExodusPoint will pass on unlimited costs to investors that are expected to be “substantial” over time making it more expensive than its peers.

Since launching ExodusPoint expanded rapidly by quickly increasing its headcount and opening new offices. In October 2018, Schonfeld Strategic Advisors sued ExodusPoint to stop it poaching its employees although ExodusPoint  eventually won the lawsuit.

However, despite having a strong debut, ExodusPoint has struggled in its performance compared to its peers. In 2019, ExodusPoint had a return of 6.8% compared to the Hedge Fund average of 9%. In 2022, ExodusPoint had a return of 5.5% to 6% which was lower that its peers including Millennium Management which had over double the return at 12.4%. One of the main reasons for its overall lacklustre performance is its equities and quantitative finance businesses have significantly underperformed despite massive costs and investments placed into them.

Since its launch, ExodusPoint has only performed fundraising once in the Spring of 2020 where it raised $3 billion.

In recent years, the firm suffers from significant staff turnover and numerous senior executives have already left.

References

External links
 

2017 establishments in New York City
Financial services companies established in 2017
Hedge fund firms in New York City
Investment management companies of the United States
Privately held companies based in New York City